Clearwater USD 264 is a public unified school district headquartered in Clearwater, Kansas, United States.  The district includes the communities of Clearwater, Bayneville, Clonmel, Millerton, and nearby rural areas.

Schools
The school district operates the following schools:
 Clearwater High School
 Clearwater Intermediate-Middle School
 Clearwater Elementary West School

See also
 Kansas State Department of Education
 Kansas State High School Activities Association
 List of high schools in Kansas
 List of unified school districts in Kansas

References

External links
 

School districts in Kansas
Education in Sedgwick County, Kansas